Servet Kocyigit  ( b. 1971, Kaman, Turkey) is a visual artist based in Amsterdam, Netherlands.

Biography 
He studied art at Gerrit Rietveld Academy, Amsterdam and currently lives and works between Amsterdam and İstanbul. He participated in several artist residency programs: De Ateliers Amsterdam, Holland (1999), Wilhelm Lehmbruck Residency Duisburg, Germany (2000), JCVA Jerusalem Center for the Visual Arts, Israel (2006), JoBurg Now, Johannesburg, South Africa (2016)

Exhibitions 
Koçyiğit work was exhibited internationally, including galleries, art institutions and museums in Holland, Turkey, France, Germany, Brazil, Israel, China and Italy. Servet Kocyigit’s solo exhibitions includes those at Rampa Gallery in Istanbul, Officine Dell’Immagine in Milan, Outlet Independent Art Space in Istanbul, Givon Art Gallery in Tel-Aviv, Nederlands Foto Museum in Rotterdam, Israel Museum, Herzliya Museum of Contemporary Art and Haifa Museum of Art among others.

He has participated in group exhibitions including, 27th São Paulo Biennale in Brazil, 9th Istanbul Biennale, Biennale Cuvée, Linz in Austria, De Kleine Biennale Utrecht in Holland, Centrum Kultury ZAMEK in Poznan, Istanbul Modern Turkey (2014), “Castrum Peregrini Amsterdam, The Netherlands (2014), Lianzhou Foto Festival China (2012), HOK ( Henie Onstad Kunstsenter ) Oslo Norway (2012), ARTER Space For Art, Istanbul (2010), TANAS Berlin (2011), Palais Des Beaux Arts De Lille  France (2009), Smart Project Space, Amsterdam (2008), Haifa Museum of Art Israel,(2007), The Israel Museum Jerusalem (2006), Herzliya Museum Of Contemporary Art, Israel (2006), MuHKA- Media Antwerpen, Belgium (2005), Proje 4L Istanbul Museum of Contemporary Art (2002), De Appel Center for Contemporary Art, Amsterdam (2001), Wilhelm Lehmbruck Museum Duisburg Germany (2000).

Awards 
Servet Koçyiğit received several grants and prizes, including Shpilman International Prize for Excellence in Photography 2016, awarded by Israel Museum in Jerusalem. He is a winner of “The New best photographer of the year” at Lianzhou Foto festival in 2012. He received OC&V scholarship from Dutch Ministry of Culture (1997), Wilhelm Lehmbruck Fellowship (1999), Residency Grant from Mondriaan Fonds (2016), Working Grant, FBKvB The Netherlands Foundation for Visual Arts (2008). He has been nominated for PrixPictet (2010 )“ Growth “ and for The Fritschy Award (2006).

References

External links 
 Servet Koçyiğit
 Servet Koçyiğit at Istanbul Biennial
 Servet Koçyiğit at São Paulo Art Biennial

20th-century Turkish male artists
21st-century Turkish male artists
1971 births
Living people
Turkish conceptual artists